The SBTVD Forum is a non-profit organization of private and public companies responsible for the general aspects of Digital TV deployment in Brazil. The organization was founded in 2007 in order to address all technical issues regarding the upcoming SBTVD standard, also known as ISDB-Tb (ISDB-T version B).

There are over 80 companies members of the SBTVD Forum ranging from all areas of the television industry, including broadcasters, receiver and transmitter manufacturers, universities, software industries and regulatory governmental agencies. Association to the SBTVD Forum is available for all companies regardless of nationality.

Standards
One of the most important tasks of the SBTVD Forum is the development writing of the technical standards that describe the inner workings of digital television transmission and reception in the Brazil. The standard were written by telecommunications and television experts from many companies and universities and cover in detail all the aspects regarding SBTVD. The complete documents can be found and downloaded freely in English, Spanish and Portuguese at ABNT's website.

Modules and workgroups
The SBTVD Forum is the recognize entity for discussions and meetings about Digital TV in Brazil, and also play the role of technical consultant to the Brazilian Digital TV Development Committee, a governmental group responsible system regulation. There are four different Modules that addresses topics from separate perspectives: a Technical Module, a Marketing Module, an Intellectual Property Module and a Market Module.

Members
Abril Radiodifusão S/A
Canal Brasileiro da Informação – CBI Ltda
Empreendimentos Radiodifusão Cabo Frio S/A
Empresa Paulista de Televisão
Fundação Cásper Líbero
Fundação de Radiodifusão Futura
Globo Comunicação e Participações S/A
Globo Comunicação e Participações S/A - Filial de Belo Horizonte – MG
Globo Comunicação e Participações S/A - Filial de Brasília – DF
Globo Comunicação e Participações S/A - Filial de Recife – PE
Globo Comunicação e Participações S/A - Filial de São Paulo – SP
Rádio e Televisão Iguaçu S/A
Radio e Televisão Record S/A
Rádio e TV Bandeirantes Ltda
Radio Televisão de Sergipe S/A
Rádio TV do Amazonas Ltda - TV Rondônia
RBS Participações S/A
Shop Tour TV Ltda
Sistema Clube de Comunicação Ltda
Sistema Norte de Rádio e Televisão Ltda
Sociedade Radio Emissora Paranaense S/A
Televisão Liberal Ltda
Televisão Ponta Porã Ltda
Televisão Rio Formoso Ltda
Televisão Verdes Mares Ltda
TV SBT Canal 05 de Porto Alegre Ltda
TV SBT Canal 11 do Rio de Janeiro Ltda
TV SBT Canal 4 de São Paulo S/A
TV Studio de Brasília Ltda
LG Electronics da Amazonia Ltda
Panasonic do Brasil Ltda
Philips da Amazônia Industria Eletrônica Ltda
Samsung Eletrônica da Amazônia Ltda
Semp Toshiba Amazonas S/A
Sony Brasil Ltda
Centro de Excelência em Tecnologia Eletrônica Avançada - CEITEC
Centro Federal de Educação Tecnológica do Ceará – CEFETCE
Fundação Centro de Análise, Pesquisa e Inovação Tecnológica - FUCAPI
Fundação CPqD: Centro de Pesquisa e Desenvolvimento em Telecomunicações
Fundação Instituto Nacional de Telecomunicações - INATEL
Laboratório de Sistemas Integráveis da Escola Politécnica da Usp
Pontificia Universidade Católica do Rio de Janeiro
Pontifícia Universidade Católica do Rio Grande do Sul -PUCRS
Universidade de Brasília
Universidade do Vale do Rio dos Sinos - Unisinos
Universidade Estadual de Campinas - Unicamp
Universidade Federal da Paraíba - UFPB
Universidade Federal de Santa Catarina - UFSC
Universidade Federal do Ceará - UFC
Universidade Federal do Rio de Janeiro - UFRJ
Universidade Federal do Rio Grande do Sul - UFRGS
Universidade Presbiteriana Mackenzie
Linear Equipamentos Eletrônicos S/A
Superior Tecnologia em Radiodifusão Ltda
Tecsys do Brasil Industrial Ltda
EITV Entretenimento e Interatividade para TV Digital com Serv de Produtos de Informática
Le Serviços de Informática e Comércio Ltda
Quality Software S/A
Totvs S/A
Tqtvd Software Ltda
Wimobilis Digital Technologies Informática Ltda
Envision Indústria de Produtos Eletrônicos
Rohde & Schwarz do Brasil Ltda
Schadeck Consultoria em Tecnologia da Informação Ltda
Screen Service do Brasil Ind e Com de Produtos Eletrônicos Ltda

External links
 ABNT website 
 SBTVD Forum SBTVD Forum website 
 ARIB (Association of Radio Industries and Businesses) website 
 DiBEG Digital Broadcasting Experts Group website 

Non-profit organisations based in Brazil
Digital television
ISDB
Organizations established in 2007
2007 establishments in Brazil